Henderson is an unincorporated community in Houston County, in the U.S. state of Georgia.

History
A post office called Henderson was established in 1832, and remained in operation until 1907. The community was named after Solomon H. Henderson, who engaged in Indian Trade.

References

Unincorporated communities in Houston County, Georgia
Unincorporated communities in Georgia (U.S. state)